Nothobranchius elucens is a species of brightly colored killifish in the family Nothobranchiidae. This species is endemic to northern Uganda. It is currently known from temporary swamps in the Achwa River system in the upper Nile drainage.

Sources

Links
 Nothobranchius elucens on WildNothos

elucens
Fish described in 2021
Fish of Uganda
Endemic fauna of Uganda